Cora is a given name, most commonly derived from the Ancient Greek Κόρη (Kórē), an epithet of the Greek goddess Persephone. Alternatively, but rarely, it may be rooted in the Gaelic cora, the comparative of cóir, meaning just, honest, virtuous or good. Variant forms of this name include Kora and Korra.

History 
The current name Cora may be derived from a variety of origins. Its most prominent antecedents, however, lie in ancient Greece.

Ancient Greece 
The Greek word κόρη (korē) can mean girl, maiden or daughter. In the latter sense it came to be an alternate name given to Persephone to denote her being the daughter of Demeter, who accordingly carries the epithet Μήτηρ (Mētēr), mother. Κόρη was used when addressing Persephone not as queen of the underworld, but as vegetation goddess.

Today's pronunciation of Cora is foreshadowed in some Greek dialects. In both Doric and Aeolic κόρη becomes κόρα (kora), in Doric it also appears as κώρα (kōra), thus phonetically resembling the current English name rather closely. The spelling κόρα is used especially in poetic writings, as in the following instance by Aeschylus:

As pointed out by H. Weir Smith, Δίκα ("Justice") can be read as a contraction of Δι(ὸς) κ(όρ)α, "daughter of Zeus".

Metaphorically, κόρη and its variants can also refer to a puppet; the pupil of the eye, because a small image is mirrored within, and hence figuratively also the apple of one's eye.

Ancient Rome 
In its current spelling, Cora appears as a Latinisation of Persephone's epithet in Roman inscriptions. Fabia Aconia Paulina for example, who lived in the 4th century, was consecrated to Cora twice.

Of different, namely Celtic, descent is Cora as toponym for a town and river (today la Cure) in the Roman province of Gaul.

Modernity 
In The Court of the Gentiles (1669), his extensive attempt to trace all ancient ideas and beliefs back to Hebrew scriptures, Theophilus Gale claims that Cora originated from the Hebrew הורה (hora).

The name Cora gained prominence among a wider audience through Jean-François Marmontel's novel Les Incas of 1777, where it is given to an Inca girl consecrated as a virgin to the sun. It is thus used much in accordance with the original Greek word. In view of his subject matter – the destruction of the Inca empire ("l'empire du Pérou") following that of the Aztec empire – Marmontel may have found another motive in the ethnic group of the same name, who resisted Spanish conquest until 1722, some 200 years longer than their neighbours (together referred to by him as "l'empire du Mexique").

Brought to fame by Marmontel, Cora inspired a series of other works, among them an opera by the French composer Étienne Méhul and a play by the German dramatist August von Kotzebue, Die Sonnenjungfrau (The Virgin of the Sun), both of 1791. Likely to have followed in this tradition, James Fenimore Cooper gave the name Cora to his heroine in The Last of the Mohicans of 1826.

People 
Cora Alicto (Low) (born 1980), track and field sprint athlete who competes for Guam
Cora Almerino, Cebuano Visayan writer
Cora Lily Woodard Aycock (1868–1952), American political hostess
Cora Amalia Castilla (born 1961), Mexican politician and activist
Cora Ann Pair Thomas (1875–1952), American Baptist missionary
Cora Baggerly Older (1875– 1968), American writer and historian
Cora Baldock (born 1935), Australian-Dutch Sociologist
Cora Berliner (1890–1942), German economist and social scientist
Cora Belle Brewster (1859–?), American physician, surgeon, medical writer, editor
Cora Brown (1914–1972), first African-American woman elected to a U.S. state senate
Cora Bussey Hillis (1858–1924), American child welfare advocate
Cora Camoin (1930–2018), French actress
Cora Campbell (born 1974), Canadian water polo player
Cora Cané (1923–2016), Argentine journalist
Cora Cardigan (1860–1931), stage name of Hannah Rosetta Dinah Parks, English flautist 
Cora Catherine Calhoun Horne (1865–1932), Black suffragist, civil rights activist, and Atlanta socialite
Cora Cohen (born 1943), American artist
Cora Combs (1923–2015), American professional wrestler
Cora Coralina (1889–1985), Brazilian poet
Cora Crane (1868–1910), American businesswoman, nightclub and bordello owner, writer, and journalist
Cora Daniels, African-American author
Cora Diamond (born 1937), American philosopher
Cora Dow (1868–1915), American pharmacist
Cora Alice Du Bois (1903–1991), American cultural anthropologist
Cora Durand (1902–1998), Picuris Pueblo potter
Cora E. (born 1968), German hip-hop artist
Cora E. Simpson (1880–1960), American nurse and nursing educator
Cora Elm (1891–1949), American nurse in World War I
Cora Emmanuel (born 1992), French fashion model
Cora Etter (1924–2020), Canadian politician
Cora Evans (1904–1957), American Mormon leader
Cora Farrell (born 1999), American curler
Cora Folsom Salisbury (1868–1916), American musician and composer
Cora G. Burwell (1883–1982), American astronomical researcher
Cora Goffin (1902–2004), British actress
Cora Gooseberry (–1852), Aboriginal Australian Murro-ore-dial woman and cultural knowledge keeper
Cora Gordon (1879–1950), English artist, writer, and musician
Cora Green (1895-after 1949), American actress, singer, and dancer
Cora Harrington, American writer and lingerie expert
Cora Hartshorn (1873–1958), American pioneer in the field of birth control
Cora Helena Sarle (1867–1956), American Shaker artist
Cora Hubbard (1877–?), American outlaw
Cora Huber (born 1981), Swiss bobsledder
Cora Huidekoper Clarke (1851–1916), American amateur entomologist, science educator, and botanist
Cora Jipson Beckwith (1875–1955), American zoologist
Cora Johnstone Best (1878–1930), American mountaineer
Cora Kelley Ward (1920–1989), American painter and photographer
Cora Laparcerie (1875–1951), French comedian, poet, and director
Cora LaRedd, American singer and dancer in the 1920s and 1930s
Cora LeEthel Christian, the first native woman of the U.S. Virgin Islands to earn a medical degree
Cora Lenore Williams (1865–1937), American writer and educator
Cora Linn Daniels (1852–1934), American author
Cora Livingston (1887/1889 -1957), American professional wrestler
Cora Louisa Burrell (1889–1962), New Zealand National Party activist
Cora Mae Bryant (1926–2008), American blues musician
Cora Martin-Moore (1927–2005), American gospel singer
Cora Miao (born 1958), Chinese actress
Cora Mildred Maris Clark (1885–1967), New Zealand hockey player, administrator, and nurse
Cora Millet-Robinet (1798–1890), French agricultural innovator and silk producer
Cora Nyegaard (1812–1891), Danish composer
Cora Olivero (born 1978), Spanish athlete
Cora Pearl (1835–1886), French courtesan
Cora Scott Pond Pope (1856–?), American teacher, scriptwriter, real estate developer
Cora Randolph Trimble (1871–1946), American socialite
Cora Ratto de Sadosky (1912–1981), Argentine mathematician, educator, and militant activist
Cora Reynolds Anderson (1882–1950), American politician
Cora Rigby (1865–1930), American journalist
Cora Rónai (born 1953), Brazilian writer, journalist, and photographer
Cora Sadosky de Goldstein (1940–2010), Argentine mathematician
Cora Sandel (1880–1974), Norwegian painter and writer
Cora Schumacher (born 1976), German actress, model, racing driver, and presenter
Cora L. V. Scott (1840–1923), American medium
Cora Semmes Ives (1834–1916), American writer
Cora Seton (born 1969), American author
Cora Sherlock (born 1976), Irish writer, blogger, and campaigner
Cora Skinner (born 1985), American glamour model and actress
Cora Slocomb di Brazza (1862–1944), American-born Italian activist and businesswoman
Cora Smalley Brooks (1885–1930), American painter
Cora Smith Eaton (1867–1939), American suffragist, physician, and mountaineer
Cora Staunton (born 1981), Irish footballer
Cora Stephan (born 1951), German writer
Cora Sternberg (born 1951), American medical oncologist
Cora Sue Collins (born 1927), American former child actress
Cora Sutton Castle (1880–1966), American educator, Sociologist, author, and clubwoman
Cora Taylor (born 1936), Canadian writer
Cora Taylor Casselman (1888–1964), Canadian federal politician
Cora Urquhart Brown-Potter (1857–1936), American stage actress
Cora van Nieuwenhuizen (born 1963), Dutch politician
Cora Vander Broek (born 1977), American actress
Cora Venus Lunny (born 1982), Irish violinist
Cora Waddell (born 1989), Filipino actress, fashion model, and video blogger
Cora Faith Walker (1960s–2022), American lawyer and politician
Cora Walker (1922–2006), American lawyer
Cora Walton (1928–2009), birth name of American Blues singer Koko Taylor
Cora Westland (born 1962), Dutch cyclist
Cora Stuart Wheeler (1852–1897), American poet, author
Cora Wilding (1888–1982), New Zealand physiotherapist and artist
Cora Wilson Stewart (1875–1958), American social reformer and educator
Cora Witherspoon (1890–1957), American actress
Kora Karvouni (born 1980), Greek actress
Alex Cora (born 1975), Puerto Rican professional baseball player and team manager 
Belle Cora (1827?–1862), American Madam of the Barbary Coast 
Cat Cora (born 1967), American chef on Food Network's Iron Chef America
Joey Cora (born 1965), Puerto Rican former professional baseball player
Sexy Cora or Carolin Ebert (1987–2011), German actress, model, and singer
Tayfun Cora (born 1983), Turkish footballer
Tom Cora (1953–1998), American cellist

Fictional characters 

Cora, the main character of the 1915 film of the same name directed by Edwin Carewe
Cora Crawley, from the series Downton Abbey
 Cora Cross, from the United Kingdom soap EastEnders
 Cora Dithers, from the comic strip Blondie
 Cora Peterson, from the 1966 science fiction film Fantastic Voyage
 Cora Mills (also known as the Queen of Hearts), from the fantasy-drama series Once Upon a Time
 Cora Ann Milton, from The Ringer, a play by Edgar Wallace
 Cora Munro, heroine of The Last of the Mohicans, by James Fenimore Cooper
 Cora Tannetti, from the Netflix original series The Sinner
 Cora Hale, from the MTV series Teen Wolf
 Cora Cartmell, from Titanic
 Cora, protagonist of The Underground Railroad, by Colson Whitehead
 Cora, a shopkeeper in television commercials for Maxwell House coffee portrayed by Margaret Hamilton
 Cora Tull, a narrator and fictional character from Faulkner's As I Lay Dying
 Cora Thayer Prescott, aunt of the main character of the Netflix series Spirit Riding Free
 Korra, the main character of the animated television series The Legend of Korra

See also
 Cora (disambiguation)
 Kora (disambiguation)

References

English feminine given names
Greek-language surnames
Surnames
Greek-language names